The castra of Bumbești-Jiu now known as Gară was a fort in the Roman province of Dacia in the 2nd and 3rd centuries AD. A contemporary settlement was also unearthed at the fort. The ruins of the fort are located in Bumbești-Jiu (Romania). In the same town, the ruins of an other Roman fort were also unearthed.

See also
List of castra

External links
Roman castra from Romania - Google Maps / Earth 
Castrele romane de la Bumbești Jiu, cea mai simplă soluție pentru dezvoltarea orașului

Notes

Roman legionary fortresses in Romania
History of Oltenia
Historic monuments in Gorj County